Computational epistemology is a subdiscipline of formal epistemology that studies the intrinsic complexity of inductive problems for ideal and computationally bounded agents. In short, computational epistemology is to induction what recursion theory is to deduction.

Themes
Some of the themes of computational epistemology include:
the essential likeness of induction and deduction (as illustrated by systematic analogies between their respective complexity classes)
the treatment of discovery, prediction and assessment methods as effective procedures (algorithms) as originates in algorithmic learning theory.
the characterization of inductive inference problems as consisting of:  
a set of relevant possibilities (possible worlds), each of which specifies some potentially infinite sequence of inputs to the scientist's method,  
a question whose potential answers partition the relevant possibilities (in the set theoretic sense),   
a convergent success criterion and 
a set of admissible methods  
the notion of logical reliability for inductive problems

Quotations

Computational epistemology definition:
"Computational epistemology is an interdisciplinary field that concerns itself with the relationships and constraints between reality, measure, data, information, knowledge, and wisdom" (Rugai, 2013)

On making inductive problems easier to solve:
"Eliminating relevant possibilities, weakening the convergence criterion, coarsening the question, or augmenting the collection of potential strategies all tend to make a problem easier to solve" (Kelly, 2000a)

On the divergence of computational epistemology from Bayesian confirmation theory and the like:
"Whenever you are inclined to explain a feature of science in terms of probability and confirmation, take a moment to see how the issue would look in terms of complexity and success"(Kelly, 2000a)

Computational epistemology in a nutshell:

Formal learning theory is very simple in outline. An inductive problem specifies a range of epistemically possible worlds over which to succeed and determines what sort of output would be correct, where correctness may embody both content and truth (or some analogous virtue like empirical adequacy). Each possible world produces an input stream which the inductive method processes sequentially, generating its own output stream, which may terminate (ending with a mark indicating this fact) or go on forever. A notion of success specifies how the method should converge to a correct output in each possible world. A method solves the problem (in a given sense) just in case the method succeeds (in the appropriate sense) in each of the possible worlds specified by the problem. We say that such a method is reliable since it succeeds over all the epistemically possible worlds. Of two non-solutions, one is as reliable as the other just in case it succeeds in all the worlds the other one succeeds in. That's all there is to it! (Kelly et al. 1997)

On the proper role of methodology:
"It is for empirical science to investigate the details of the mechanisms whereby we track, and for methodologists to devise and refine even better (inferential) mechanisms and methods" (Nozick, 1981)

See also
Algorithmic learning theory
Bayesian confirmation theory
Belief revision
Computational learning theory
Epistemology
Formal epistemology
Inductive reasoning
Language identification in the limit
Machine learning
Methodology
Philosophy of science
Problem of induction
Scientific method

References
Blum, M. and Blum, L. (1975). "Toward a Mathematical Theory of Inductive Inference", Information and Control, 28.
Feldman, Richard, Naturalized Epistemology, The Stanford Encyclopedia of Philosophy (Fall 2001 Edition), Edward N. Zalta (ed.).
Glymour, C. and Kelly, K. (1992). ‘Thoroughly Modern Meno’, in: Inference, Explanation and Other Frustrations, ed. John Earman, University of California Press.
Gold, E. M. (1965) "Limiting Recursion", Journal of Symbolic Logic 30: 27-48.
 
Hájek, Alan, Interpretations of Probability, The Stanford Encyclopedia of Philosophy (Summer 2003 Edition), Edward N. Zalta (ed.).
Harrell, M. (2000). Chaos and Reliable Knowledge, Ph.D. Thesis, University of California at San Diego.
Harrell, M. and Glymour, C. (2002). "Confirmation And Chaos," Philosophy of Science, volume 69 (2002), pages 256–265
Hawthorne, James, Inductive Logic, The Stanford Encyclopedia of Philosophy (Winter 2005 Edition), Edward N. Zalta (ed.).
Hendricks, Vincent F. (2001). The Convergence of Scientific Knowledge, Dordrecht: Springer.
Hendricks, Vincent F. (2006). Mainstream and Formal Epistemology, New York: Cambridge University Press.
Hendricks, Vincent F., John Symons Epistemic Logic, The Stanford Encyclopedia of Philosophy  (Spring 2006 Edition), Edward N. Zalta (ed.).
Hodges, Wilfrid, Logic and Games, The Stanford Encyclopedia of Philosophy (Winter 2004 Edition), Edward N. Zalta (ed.).
Kelly, Kevin (1996). The Logic of Reliable Inquiry, Oxford: Oxford University Press.
Kelly, Kevin (2000a). ‘The Logic of Success’, British Journal for the Philosophy of Science 51:4, 639-660.
Kelly, Kevin (2000b). "Naturalism Logicized", in After Popper, Kuhn and Feyerabend: Current Issues in Scientific Method, R. Nola and H. Sankey, eds, 34 Dordrecht: Kluwer, 2000, pp. 177–210.
Kelly, Kevin (2002). "Efficient Convergence Implies Ockham's Razor", Proceedings of the 2002 International Workshop on Computational Models of Scientific Reasoning and Applications, Las Vegas, USA, June 24–27, 2002.
Kelly, Kevin (2004a). "Uncomputability: The Problem of Induction Internalized", Theoretical Computer Science, pp. 317: 2004, 227-249.
Kelly, Kevin (2004b). "Learning Theory and Epistemology", in Handbook of Epistemology, I. Niiniluoto, M. Sintonen, and J. Smolenski, eds. Dordrecht: Kluwer, 2004
Kelly, Kevin (2004c). "Justification as Truth-finding Efficiency: How Ockham's Razor Works", Minds and Machines 14: 2004, pp. 485–505.
Kelly, Kevin (2005a). "Simplicity, Truth, and the Unending Game of Science" manuscript
Kelly, Kevin (2005b)."Learning, Simplicity, Truth, and Misinformation" manuscript
Kelly, K., and Glymour, C. (2004). "Why Probability Does Not Capture the Logic of Scientific Justification", in Christopher Hitchcock, ed., Contemporary Debates in the Philosophy of Science, London: Blackwell, 2004.Kelly, K., and Schulte, O. (1995) ‘The Computable Testability of Theories Making Uncomputable Predictions’, Erkenntnis 43, pp. 29–66.
Kelly, K., Schulte, O. and Juhl, C. (1997). ‘Learning Theory and the Philosophy of Science’, Philosophy of Science 64, 245-67.Kelly, K., Schulte, O. and Hendricks, V. (1995) ‘Reliable Belief Revision’. Proceedings of the XII Joint International Congress for Logic, Methodology and the Philosophy of Science.
Nozick, R. (1981) Philosophical Explanations, Cambridge: Harvard University Press.
Osherson, D., Stob, M. and Weinstein, S. (1985). Systems that Learn, 1st Ed., Cambridge: MIT Press.
Putnam, H. (1963). "'Degree of Confirmation' and 'Inductive Logic'", in The Philosophy of Rudolf Carnap, ed. P.a. Schilpp, La Salle, Ill: Open Court.
Putnam, H. (1965). "Trial and error predicates and the solution to a problem of Mostowski", Journal of Symbolic Logic, 30(1):49-57, 1965.
Quine, W. V. (1992) Pursuit of Truth, Cambridge: Harvard University Press.
Reichenbach, Hans (1949). "The pragmatic justification of induction," in Readings in Philosophical Analysis, ed. H. Feigl and W. Sellars (New York: Appleton-Century-Crofts, 1949), pp. 305–327.
Rugai, N. (2013) 'Computational Epistemology:  From Reality to Wisdom', Second Edition, Book, Lulu Press, .
Salmon, W. (1967) The Logic of Scientific Inference, Pittsburgh: University of Pittsburgh Press.
Salmon, W. (1991). ‘Hans Reichenbach's Vindication of Induction,’ Erkenntnis 35:99-122.
Schulte, O. (1999a). “Means-Ends Epistemology,” British Journal for the Philosophy of Science, 50, 1-31.
Schulte, O. (1999b). ‘The Logic of Reliable and Efficient Inquiry’, Journal of Philosophical Logic 28, 399-438.
Schulte, O. (2000). ‘Inferring Conservation Principles in Particle Physics: A Case Study in the Problem of Induction’, The British Journal for the Philosophy of Science, 51: 771-806.
Schulte, O. (2003). Formal Learning Theory, The Stanford Encyclopedia of Philosophy (Fall 2003 Edition), Edward N. Zalta (ed.).
Schulte, O., and Juhl, C. (1996). ‘Topology as Epistemology’, The Monist 79, 1:141-147.
Sieg, Wilfried (2002a). "Calculations by Man & Machine: Mathematical presentation" in: Proceedings of the Cracow International Congress of Logic, Methodology and Philosophy of Science, Synthese Series, Kluwer Academic Publishers, 2002, 245-260.
Sieg, Wilfried (2002b). "Calculations by Man & Machine: Conceptual analysis" in: Reflections on the Foundations of Mathematics, (Sieg, Sommer, and Talcott, eds.), 2002, 396-415
Steup, Matthias, Epistemology, The Stanford Encyclopedia of Philosophy (Winter 2005 Edition), Edward N. Zalta (ed.).
Talbott, William, Bayesian Epistemology, The Stanford Encyclopedia of Philosophy (Fall 2001 Edition), Edward N. Zalta (ed.).

External links
Research Areas: Computational Epistemology, Kevin Kelly

Belief revision
Formal epistemology
Philosophy of science
Computational fields of study